Phaegorista similis is a species of moth in the family Erebidae. It is found in Africa, including Zaire and Angola.

Aganainae
Insects of Cameroon
Insects of the Democratic Republic of the Congo
Insects of West Africa
Insects of Uganda
Insects of Angola
Fauna of Togo
Fauna of Zambia
Moths of Africa